A list of notable Uruguayan businesspeople. Note that many of the entries may have served under another profession aside from their business pursuits; some may be better known as political figures or soldiers.

A

Ricardo Alarcón (Uruguay)
Aarón de Anchorena

B

Enrique Baliño
Barón de Mauá
José de Buschental

C

Mario Carminatti
Washington Cataldi

D

Lætitia d'Arenberg

E

Julián de Gregorio Espinosa

F

Daniel Fonseca

G

Perfecto Giot
Juan Balbín González Vallejo
Juan Gorlero
Juan Grompone

H

Francisco Hocquart

J

Juan D. Jackson
Nicolás Jodal
Julio Sánchez Padilla

L

Samuel Lafone
Francisco Lecocq
Carlos Alberto Lecueder
Mauricio Litman
Antonio Lussich
Juan Carlos López Mena

M

Francisco Antonio Maciel
Julio Mailhos
Marcelo Mazzini
Mercedes Menafra
Natalio Michelizzi

N

Edgardo Novick

P

Fernando Parrado
Jorge Peirano Facio
Walter Pintos Risso
Francisco Piria
Humberto Pittamiglio
Samuel Priliac

R

Emilio Reus
Blanca Rodríguez
Alejo Rossell y Rius

S

Irineu Evangelista de Sousa

T

Thomas Tomkinson

V

Francisco Vidiella
Leonel Viera
Miguel Antonio Vilardebó
José Villar
José Villar Gómez

Cattlemen

A

Aarón de Anchorena
Timoteo Aparicio
Hernando Arias de Saavedra
José Gervasio Artigas

B

Domingo Bordaberry
Juan María Bordaberry
Santiago Bordaberry

D
José Joaquín de Viana

F

Wilson Ferreira Aldunate
Venancio Flores
Francisco Aguilar y Leal

G

Alberto Gallinal Heber
Tomás García de Zúñiga

H

Luis Alberto de Herrera
	
M

Luis Eduardo Mallo
Benito Medero

P

Alfredo Puig Spangenberg

S

Aparicio Saravia
Basilicio Saravia

V

Federico Vidiella

Z

Pedro Zabalza Arrospide

 
Business
Uruguayan